"Twilight of Idols" is a 1917 essay by Randolph Bourne on the moral failings of instrumental pragmatist philosophy in the wake of American entry into World War I.

Background and summary 

Following April 1917 American entry into World War I, the Seven Arts literary journal and left-wing intellectual circle began to publish several outspoken essays by Randolph Bourne, who had been ostracized from other publications for his anti-war stance, from June through October. This series ended with "Twilight of Idols" in the magazine's final issue. The essay describes how instrumental pragmatism failed as a philosophy when confronted with the war question. Bourne called for other discontents to join him in critical defiance. His tone was direct yet devoid of political slogans.

Bourne contended that instrumentalism's preoccupation with moral ends and proper means forgot about values. Similarly, pragmatists who uncritically focused on process and efficiency did not mind quality of life. The youth, Bourne wrote, were trained to execute on events but not to contemplate the intellectual worth of their outcomes. The "idols" referenced in Bourne's title were his former mentor, John Dewey, and other socialist luminaries of his generation, including Samuel Gompers, Algie Martin Simons, and John Spargo. He excoriated his generation's intellectuals as lacking a philosophy of life aside for connecting means to ends: "They are vague as to what kind of society they want, or what kind of society America needs, but they are equipped with all the administrative attitudes and talents necessary to attain it."

Analysis 

Bourne's biographer described the essay's publication, having attacked the main intellectuals of his era, as "intellectual suicide".

References

Bibliography

Further reading 

 
 * 
 
 

1917 works
Essays
Anti-war works
John Dewey
Pragmatism